"Home Ain't Home" is a song by American rapper YoungBoy Never Broke Again featuring Rod Wave, released on August 5, 2022, as the thirteenth track from YoungBoy's fourth studio album, The Last Slimeto. The track sees YoungBoy and Rod Wave rap on a slow, mellow R&B beat about both artists' struggles with love and relationships.

Composition
"Home Ain't Home" is "a nimble, deeply affecting workout". The song's title serves as a metaphor for the artists noting that their money can't bring them happiness as YoungBoy raps: "feelin' like my home ain't no home". However, the name shares a double meaning as it can also be interpreted as the artist feeling like their house isn't home due to the lack of love inside. YoungBoy's verse is described to "[swing] skillfully between reflection and regret" whereas "Rod Wave’s melodramatic wails break the mood." It's also noted that YoungBoy "deploys [autotune] strategically on choruses" and that he has "cut back on the weepy Autotuned cheese he slathered over past projects like 2020's Top."

Critical reception
Clashs Robin Murray noted that Rod Wave's features "come[s] close to stealing the show." Alongside "My Go To," the track is noted as, "the best ballad-y type tracks on the album; proving once again that YoungBoy, stylistically, is a strong collaborator for anyone in music right now."

Charts

Refrences

2022 songs
YoungBoy Never Broke Again songs
Songs written by YoungBoy Never Broke Again
Rod Wave songs
Songs written by Rod Wave